The 2018 FIBA Africa Women's Champions Cup was the 24th edition of the FIBA Africa Basketball Club Championship for Women, the international basketball club tournament of FIBA Africa. The tournament was held in Maputo, Mozambique, from 17 to 25 November 2018.

Ferroviário de Maputo from the host country won their maiden title, and their country's sixth title overall, by edging out the five-time champions Interclube of Angola, 59-56, in the Finals.

Draw
The draw for the tournament took place on 15 November in the Mozambican capital city of Maputo.

Squads

Preliminary round
All times are local (UTC+2).

Group A

Group B

Final round

9th-10th Classification

RD3

5th-8th Classification

Semifinals

7th Place

5th Place

3rd Place

Final

Final ranking

Awards

All-Star Five
The following players were named to the All-Star Five line-up.

References

FIBA Africa Women's Clubs Champions Cup
Women's Clubs Champions Cup
FIBA